Caudal Deportivo is a Spanish football team based in Mieres, in the autonomous community of Asturias. Founded in 1918 it plays in Tercera División RFEF – Group 2, holding home matches at Estadio Hermanos Antuña (built in 1951), with a capacity of 2,940 spectators.

History
In 1914 Sporting de Mieres was founded, without any link to the Football Federation, and the club disappeared four years later, demoralized by the constant losses. That same year, on 6 July and after a draw to choose the name, Racing Club de Mieres was created, with the team being renamed Caudal Deportivo de Mieres after the Spanish Civil War, as all foreign denominations were forbidden.

In 1946 Caudal first reached the third division, promoting to the second five years later – the Segunda División B category would only see the light of day in the late-1970s. Starting in 1980 and with the exception of one year, the club would spend the following 18 seasons in the fourth level, then play seven out of eight years in the third, being relegated back in 2004.

Caudal won its group in the 2009–10 season – it had already finished first in 2006–07, albeit without promotion – and returned to division three after defeating Jumilla CF in the playoffs. At the end of the 2012–13 campaign, again in the third tier and just one year after promoting, it managed to qualify for the promotion playoffs after the fourth place in the regular season. However, Caudal was relegated again to Tercera División during the next season, but two years later came back to the third tier.

Rivalries
Caudal's historic rival is UP Langreo. Both teams meet in the Asturian Mining basins derby.

Season to season

7 seasons in Segunda División
14 seasons in Segunda División B
53 seasons in Tercera División
1 season in Tercera División RFEF

Current squad

Honours
Tercera División: 1949–50, 1958–59, 1959–60, 1962–63, 1963–64, 1983–84, 1986–87, 1990–91, 1992–93, 1993–94, 1994–95, 2002–03, 2006–07, 2009–10, 2011–12, 2015–16
Copa Federación de España (Asturias tournament): 1995, 1998, 2005, 2020

Famous players
Note: this list includes players that have played at least 100 league games and/or have reached international status.
 Alvarito
 Berto

Basketball section
Caudal Deportivo had a basketball section until the 1990s, that played in the Spanish third tier in the 1995–96 season.

References

External links
Official website 
Futbolme team profile 
Unofficial website 

Football clubs in Asturias
Association football clubs established in 1918
1918 establishments in Spain
Segunda División clubs